David Meyer is a South African actor. He is most noted for his performance in the 1997 television miniseries Ekhaya: A Family Chronicle (a/k/a Molo Fish), for which he was a Gemini Award nominee for Best Actor in a Drama Series at the 12th Gemini Awards.

He also appeared in the films Sterk Skemer (1999), The Long Run (2000) and The Trio of Minuet (2003).

Of mixed Swazi and Coloured South African descent, he is originally from Alexandra, Gauteng.

References

External links

South African male film actors
South African male television actors
People from Alexandra, Gauteng
Living people
Year of birth missing (living people)